MV Ilala, formally Ilala II, is a motor ship that has plied Lake Malawi in East Africa since 1951. She carries both passengers and freight, and calls at major towns on both the Malawian and Mozambican coast, as well as at two islands of the lake (Likoma and Chizumulu).

While the ship is often late (reportedly by as much as 24 hours or more) and has sometimes broken down she remains the most important means of long-distance transport for the people living on the coast of the lake.

History
 
Yarrow Shipbuilders at Scotstoun near Glasgow, Scotland built Ilala for Nyasaland Railways in 1949. As she was the second boat to be built for service on Lake Malawi (the first being built in 1875 at Poplar), and her predecessor was called Ilala, the ship was formally named Ilala II, but she is now commonly called just Ilala and this is also how the name is painted on the hull.  In turn, the first Ilala was named after the Ilala region of Zambia, where David Livingstone was first buried.

Once built, the ship was dismantled and transported to Malawi (then Nyasaland) in pieces, first by ship to Mozambique and then from Beira, Mozambique by rail and road to Chipoka. She is operated by Malawi Lake Services and based in Monkey Bay, Malawi (on the southern end of the lake); She began operating in 1951, and has run continuously since then, except for periods of maintenance. She also survived several groundings. Some steel panels have been repaired over time, and she was re-engined in the 1990s. When Ilala has been out of service for maintenance, she was usually replaced by a companion, newer ferry called  (which means "peace" in Chewa), which otherwise only cruises the southern part of the lake. The  also provides additional coverage for Ilala.

References in culture

British historian, traveller and writer Oliver Ransford thus describes life aboard the MV Ilala in his book Malawi, Livingstone's Lake:

The ship has been depicted in several postage stamps of Nyasaland/Malawi.  In 2009, BBC Radio 4 and the BBC World Service broadcast a travelogue-style tribute in occasion of the Ilalas 60th anniversary, with interviews with managers, crew, passengers and tourists.

Route
The MV Ilala weekly calls at the following places (they are visited in this order when the boat is going north, and in the inverse order when the boat goes back south):

 Monkey Bay, Malawi
 Makanjila, Malawi
 Senga Bay, Malawi
 Nkhotakota, Malawi
 Likoma Island, Malawi
 Chizumulu Island, Malawi
 Nkhata Bay, Malawi
 Usisya, Malawi
 Ruarwe, Malawi
 Ncharo, Malawi
 Mlowe, Malawi
 Chilumba, Malawi

In the past, the ship used to reach farther north to Karonga and the short strip of the northern coast of the lake belonging to Tanzania, but this route has been discontinued.

References

1949 ships
Ships built on the River Clyde
Ferries
Paisley, Renfrewshire
Lake Malawi
Transport in Malawi
Ships of Malawi